Insurance Europe (known as Comité Européen des Assurances until March 2012) is the European insurance and reinsurance federation.

Through its 37 member bodies — the national insurance associations — it represents all types of insurance and reinsurance undertakings, e.g. pan-European companies, monoliners, mutuals and SMEs. Insurance Europe, which is based in Brussels, Belgium, represents undertakings that account for around 95% of total European premium income. Insurance makes a major contribution to Europe's economic growth and development. European insurers generate premium income of €1,200 billion, employ almost one million people and invest more than €10,200 billion in the economy.

The federation is the voice of the European insurance industry at European and international levels. It is a fair and reliable partner and a contact point for Institutions of the European Union, politicians and supervisors. The federation provides services to the European and international institutions to the benefit of its members. In the regulatory process, it represents the common interests of European insurers by developing, promoting, defending, illustrating and lobbying industry positions that are supported by technical research and expertise. Through government lobby, public affairs, industry forums and issue management, it contributes to achieve a positive political, social, business and economic environment in support of the industry.

Insurance Europe provides the infrastructure for an exchange information and experience between members. The federation also plays a supporting role in relation to its members and provides information and guidance on issues of interest to the European insurance sector. It promotes trust and confidence in the European insurance industry.

History
Insurance Europe was founded in 1953 as Comité Européen des Assurances (CEA). Insurance Europe had 18 members in 1953 and later had several dozen national member associations. Its aim was to observe the works of the OECD in Paris. Later, CEA shifted its attention and activities to the European arena, therefore adapting to the power structures resulting from the foundation of the European Community and its more recent evolution into the European Union. It changed its name from Comité Européen des Assurances in March 2012.

In 2020, it has 37 member countries, and based in Brussels still, and "represents undertakings that account for around 95% of total European premium income."

Mission statement
The federation's mission is:

 To draw attention to issues of strategic interest to all European insurers and reinsurers in a sustainable manner.
 To raise awareness of insurers' and reinsurers' roles in providing insurance protection and security to the community as well as in contributing to economic growth and development.
 To promote – as the expert and representative voice of the insurance industry – a competitive and open market to the benefit of the European consumer as well as corporate clients.

References

External links
Official Website

1953 establishments in Belgium
Trade associations based in Belgium
International organisations based in Belgium
Organizations established in 1953
Pan-European trade and professional organizations
Insurance industry organizations